Qarah Daraq-e Vosta (also Romanized as Qarah Daraq-e Vosţá; also known as Owrtā Qarah Darreh) is a village in Abish Ahmad Rural District, Abish Ahmad District, Kaleybar County, East Azerbaijan Province, Iran. At the 2006 census, its population was 28, in 7 families.

References 

Populated places in Kaleybar County